Culpable homicide is a categorisation of certain offences in various jurisdictions within the Commonwealth of Nations which involves the illegal killing of a person either with or without an intention to kill depending upon how a particular jurisdiction has defined the offence. Unusually for those legal systems which have originated or been influenced during rule by the United Kingdom, the name of the offence associates with Scots law rather than English law.

Jurisdictions
"Culpable homicide" offences are found in the following jurisdictions; the description of the local version of the offence is given where available:

Canada

In Canada, "culpable homicide" is not itself an offence.  Rather, the term is used in the Criminal Code to classify all killings of persons as either culpable or not culpable homicide. There are three types of culpable homicide: murder, manslaughter and infanticide. Killings classified as not culpable are justifiable killings; thus the term is used to define the criminal intent or mens rea of a killing. Non-culpable homicide includes those committed in self-defence.

India
The offences include causing death whether by intention or not.

 Under §299 of the Indian Penal Code (IPC), "[...committer of] Culpable homicide" is defined as "Whoever causes death by doing an act with the intention of causing death, or with the intention of causing such bodily injury as is likely to cause death, or with the knowledge that he is likely by such act to cause death, commits the offence of culpable." "Culpable homicide not amounting to murder" is punishable under section 304 of IPC of the Indian Penal Code. It is a non bailable charge with imprisonment up to 10 years with or without fine.

Pakistan
The Pakistan Penal Code (PPC) in earlier form included the offence of "culpable homicide" for acts of homicide resulting from the infliction of intentional harm upon a person:

Amendments in recent years have replaced the specific phrase "culpable homicide" within those sections and introduced terms from Sharia law but it remains in §38 (Persons concerned in criminal act may be guilty of different offences).

The current equivalent sections are:

Following sections of the PPC deal further with the offence in increased detail.

Scotland
Culpable homicide is committed where the accused has caused loss of life through wrongful conduct but where there was no intention to kill or "wicked recklessness". It is an offence under common law and is roughly equivalent to the offence of manslaughter in the law of England and Wales.

While the offence charged remains the same there can be a great variation between individual cases including whether or not the act was voluntary or involuntary:
 Voluntary culpable homicide is homicide where the mens rea for murder is present but mitigating circumstances reduce the crime to culpable homicide.
 Involuntary culpable homicide is homicide where the mens rea for murder is not present but either the independent mens rea for culpable homicide is present, or the circumstances in which death was caused make it culpable homicide. Involuntary culpable homicide may arise in the context of an unlawful act or a lawful act. The mens rea requirement is different in each case.

Singapore
"Culpable homicide" is: Whoever causes death by doing an act with the intention of causing death, or with the intention of causing such bodily injury as is likely to cause death, or with the knowledge that he is likely by such act to cause death, commits the offence of culpable homicide.

Examples 
 Person A lays sticks and turf over a pit, with the intention of thereby causing death, or with the knowledge that death is likely to be thereby caused. Person Z, believing the ground to be firm, treads on it, falls in and is killed. A has committed the offence of culpable homicide.
 A knows Z to be behind a bush. B does not know it. A, intending to cause, or knowing it to be likely to cause Z’s death, induces B to fire at the bush. B fires and kills Z. Here B may be guilty of no offence; but A has committed the offence of culpable homicide.

South Africa
"Culpable homicide" has been defined (in South African law) simply as "the unlawful negligent killing of a human being", the rough equivalent of involuntary manslaughter in Anglo-American law.

See also

 Justifiable homicide
 Homicide
 Murder
 Manslaughter
 Infanticide
 Scottish criminal law
 Corporate Manslaughter and Corporate Homicide Act 2007
 Criminal Code (Canada)

References

Footnotes

Notations
 Strathclyde University Scots law course
 CanLII - Canadian Legal Information Institute

 
Law of Canada
Criminal law legal terminology
Scottish criminal law
Law of South Africa